Wills Creek Formation is a mapped Silurian bedrock unit in Pennsylvania, Maryland, Virginia, and West Virginia.

Description 
The Wills Creek is defined as a moderately well bedded greenish-gray shale containing local limestone and sandstone zones, or more specifically as an olive to yellowish-gray, thin-bedded sandstone, calcareous shale, dolomite, argillaceous limestone, and sandstone. Red shale and siltstone occur in the lower part of the formation. The formation has a thickness between 450 feet and 600 feet in Maryland and 445 to 620 feet in Pennsylvania.

The Wills Creek forms the bedrock of the valley around and to the east of Lewistown, Pennsylvania.

Fossils 
The Wills Creek Limestone contain fossils from the Pridoli to the Ludlow epoch, or 422.9 to 418.1 Ma.

Dean et al. (1985) describe the Wills Creek as sparsely fossiliferous.

Conodonts have been identified in the Wills Creek in Virginia (Ozarkodina snajdri crispa Zone).

Notable outcrops 
 Type section at Wills Creek at Cumberland, Allegany County, Maryland
 Roundtop Hill, Maryland, along railroad grade

Age 
Relative age dating of the Wills Creek places it in the Silurian period. It rests conformably a top the Bloomsburg Formation and below the Tonoloway Formation.

Economic use 
The Wills Creek is a poor source of construction material and is only suitable as common fill.

See also 
 Geology of Pennsylvania

References 

Geologic formations of Maryland
Geologic formations of Pennsylvania
Geologic formations of Virginia
Geologic formations of West Virginia
Silurian System of North America
Mudstone formations
Limestone formations of the United States
Sandstone formations of the United States
Shale formations of the United States
Silurian Maryland
Silurian geology of Pennsylvania
Silurian geology of Virginia
Silurian West Virginia
Silurian southern paleotemperate deposits